New Deorajnagar is a town in Madhya Pradesh state in central India. Ramnagar, Madhya Pradesh is nearest town from it. District headquarters of New Deorajnagar is the Satna District. It is approximately 65 kilometres from the city of Satna, 25 kilometers from Amarpatan and 5 kilometres from Ramnagar, Madhya Pradesh.
On southern side it is surrounded by Bansagar Dam and on other side is Gidhakoot (Gidhaila).

Education
New Deorajnagar has primary, middle and Hr. secondary government and private schools in its locality. For higher education, a study centre of M P Bhoj university is located here.

Transportation
New Deorajnagar is connected to another cities and towns with road links, It is connected to Rewa, Satna. Nearest rail link to it is through Maihar, which is approximately 40 kilometres from Deorajnagar. Rewa, Satna and Beohari are also nearby.

Temples
Two famous temples are located in this locality, Gidhakoot (Gidhaila) Temple is located in Gidhakoot Parvat 2 kilometres from town, Hanuman Mandir New Deorajnagar near BSNL Tower, another temple is Bindunagar temple 3 kilometres from the town. Gidhakoot (Gidhaila) parvat, laxminarayan mandir, Rajadhiraj mandir (under construction), Devi mandir of New Deorajnagar are also tourist places.

Sub villages
Pipari, Gidhaila and Karra are sub villages of New Deorajnagar.

Brief History
Old Deorajnagar was part of Rewa state. After being submerged in Bansagar dam of Deorajnagar, people were rehabilitated in New Deorajnagar, Satna, Rewa, Shahdol and many other places.  

Cities and towns in Satna district